Vinny is a rural locality (a settlement) Volodarsky District, Astrakhan Oblast, Russia and the seat of the eponymous municipality. It is a majority-minority town primarily inhabited by ethnic Kazakhs.

History 
First mentions of Vinny date back to around 1918.

Infrastructure 
Vinny is served by a public school, library, community center, post office and a few grocery stores. It is located immediately to the east of the highway connecting the city of Astrakhan with the Kazakhstan–Russia border.

Demographics 
The population was 753 as of 2010.

Ethnic composition

Geography 
Vinny is located 29 km northwest of Volodarsky (the district's administrative centre) by road. Vorobyovsky is the nearest rural locality.

Gallery

References 

Rural localities in Volodarsky District, Astrakhan Oblast